"With Apologies to Jesse Jackson" is the eleventh season premiere of the American animated television series South Park, and the 154th overall episode of the series. It first aired on Comedy Central in the United States on March 7, 2007, and was rated TV-MA-L. In the episode, Randy says the word "niggers" on the real-life game show Wheel of Fortune, leading to widespread public outrage. Stan attempts to understand the epithet's impact on his black friend Token. Meanwhile, a man with dwarfism has a hard time trying to teach Cartman to be sensitive.

Parker and Stone had long wanted to create an episode exploring the racial slur, but struggled with a plot line beyond its opening scene. They subsequently found it easier to work on following comedian Michael Richards' controversy, in which he screamed the slur at black audience members who had heckled him during his comedy act.

Despite the uncensored frequent usage of the racial slur, the episode attracted very little media attention. Parents Television Council founder L. Brent Bozell criticized the lack of protest against the episode. The episode was critically acclaimed by contemporary television critics, who praised the episode's humor and storyline. According to Nielsen Media Research, the episode was seen by 2.8 million viewers the week it was broadcast. "With Apologies to Jesse Jackson" was released on DVD along with the rest of the eleventh season on August 12, 2008.

Plot
Randy Marsh has achieved the bonus round on Wheel of Fortune. The episode is airing live, with his family in the audience and the South Park residents watching from home. Randy is given the category "People Who Annoy You", and supplied with letters, and proceeds to add more, at which point the puzzle spells "N_GGERS". Randy is given ten seconds to solve the puzzle but hesitates due to its likely pejorative content. However, when host Pat Sajak tells Randy that he has only five seconds remaining, Randy yells the assumed answer: "niggers", which stuns the audience, those watching at home, and enrages the African-American audience members; the correct answer is then revealed to be "naggers" (the A is rolled up rather than being lit up like the other letters). On the car ride home, Randy awkwardly tries to explain himself, Sharon is disgusted and Stan is beyond humiliated.

Stan goes to school the next day. Cartman confronts him, saying that Token will be mad at him for his father's actions. Stan goes to Token to try and explain, saying his father isn't racist but is just "stupid". Cartman, seeing an opportunity to incite conflict, tries to get the two into a "race war". Instead of fighting, Token leaves. Cartman sees this as forfeit, and runs away screaming "Whites win!"

Seeking forgiveness, Randy visits Jesse Jackson to apologize. Jackson bends over his desk and tells Randy to apologize by kissing his buttocks. Randy does so and a picture is taken, which is then put into the news. Stan seeks out Token, expecting everything to be better now since his dad apologized, yet Token is still mad, saying, "Jesse Jackson is not the emperor of black people!" To which Stan replies, "He told my dad he was."

Principal Victoria and Mr. Mackey, in light of recent events, bring in a dwarf author, Dr. David Nelson, who travels to schools nationwide with sensitivity seminars. However, as soon as Nelson walks onstage, Cartman bursts into hysterics. At first, Nelson believes that he would tire himself out, but realizes that he has no chance to talk, even after Mackey shouts at Cartman to knock it off.

Randy goes to Laugh Factory, where he is singled out by Black comedian Coyote Brown (who resembles Chris Rock), who calls Randy a "Nigger-Guy". Thereafter, the denizens of South Park use the name against Randy, making him feel like an outcast. Back at school, Nelson discusses Cartman with Victoria and Mackey, and asks to meet with him. When Cartman arrives, all he can do is continue to laugh and heckle. Nelson tries to insist that Eric's words don't hurt him, but as Cartman laughs, Nelson loses his temper and yells at him. This shocks Mackey and Victoria, in contrast to their prior indifference over Cartman's treatment of Nelson.

Stan once again confronts Token, but this time to say he understands how Token feels about the N-word after how he saw Cartman laugh at Nelson. Still mad, Token derides Stan's lack of understanding. After this, Nelson calls all of the students to the gymnasium to teach Cartman a lesson by making fun of his obesity with the words "Hello, fatso!" when he walks in so he understands how it feels. They do this, and Cartman responds angrily, but when Nelson comes out to scold him again, he breaks up in laughter again.

Meanwhile, in further attempts to clear his name, Randy starts the Randy Marsh African American Scholarship Foundation. When walking away from the grand opening, he is chased by a trio of socially progressive, shotgun wielding rednecks, who are angry at him for slandering an entire race of people. However, other "Nigger-Guys", led by Seinfeld alumnus Michael Richards and including former Los Angeles investigator Mark Fuhrman, rescue him and scare the rednecks off. Richards introduces Randy to other Nigger-Guys and accepts him into their ranks.

Stan gets fed up with Token, and demands to know why he's still angry. The two are interrupted by Butters, who tells them that Cartman is gonna fight Nelson in the town park, and the three run off to spectate. Before the fight, Kyle warns Cartman that Nelson is a karate black belt. After Nelson announces to beat Cartman to prove his point, which is words shouldn't hurt him, the two begin to wrestle, wherein Cartman easily gains the upper hand. Later, in Washington D.C., the "Nigger-Guys" are pleading their case to the Senate to ban the term "Nigger-Guy". The Motion is passed by the Senate and, as a result, anyone saying the words "nigger" and "guy" within seven words of each other would be prosecuted and fined while a crowd of Black people look on.

Back home, Nelson forfeits to Cartman, but as Cartman gloats, Nelson rises and kicks Cartman to the ground. However, Cartman remains unfazed and continues to laugh. An angered Nelson departs, saying he 'proved' his point, which the students have long forgotten. It is then that Stan understands that he doesn't get it, and he never will because he isn't Black. He confesses to Token, which was what he was looking to hear all along, and they reconcile.

Production
"With Apologies to Jesse Jackson" was the season premiere of South Park eleventh season, and the first episode of the show's spring 2007 run, which consists of seven episodes. Parker and Stone had wanted to create an episode centered on the racial slur "nigger" for a considerable time. The first scene, in which Randy uses the word on Wheel of Fortune, was the first idea for the episode and remained the only idea for a while; Parker called the scene "one of my favorite things we’ve ever done."

Shortly beforehand, comedian Michael Richards encountered massive controversy due to a performance at the Laugh Factory in November 2006, in which he screamed the word "nigger" repeatedly at a group of African-Americans who heckled him. Parker and Stone decided it would be best, considering the media coverage of the incident, to work on the episode then. In the episode's DVD commentary, they noted that it was clear from the video of Richards that he had significant problems, but that they really felt contempt for him when he apologized to civil rights leader Jesse Jackson. Staff writer Vernon Chatman, who is half-black, was particularly outraged by this, noting that Jackson "is not the ambassador of black people”, which inspired the line in the episode where Token says that Jackson "is not the emperor of black people". Stan responds by saying "he told my dad he was". Stone particularly enjoyed the ending of the episode, remarking, "If there was a word as hateful as the n-word [in how it] applies to black people, if there was a word like that against white people, [they] would make it illegal."

They created the idea of using the epithet to apply to whites only, which was when the rest of the episode began to germinate. While they felt the Randy A story was excellent, they wanted to have a B story involving the boys. They came up with the idea of Stan and Token arguing about his father's use of the word, which remained the only subplot idea. They continued to struggle with the subplot until roughly three days prior to air, when they created the idea of Cartman encountering a little person. They based the little person on an obscure old commercial featuring little people walking around in suits.

Reception

Reaction
This episode received coverage by the CNN programs Showbiz Tonight and Paula Zahn Now in the days following the broadcast of this episode. Kovon and Jill Flowers, who co-founded the organization Abolish the "N" Word, which is linked with the National Association for the Advancement of Colored People, praised this episode, saying it was a good example of how it felt to be called nigger.

The Parents Television Council named this episode, along with the episode of The Sarah Silverman Program that aired right after this episode, the "Worst Cable Content of the Week" in its campaign for cable choice. The episode received about 2.8 million viewers.

Critical response
Travis Fickett of IGN gave the episode a 10/10, commenting, "There's really no other way to explain how this show remains not only brilliantly funny, but more relevant and insightful than anything else on television." In 2009, Sean O'Neal of The A.V. Club praised the episode, remarking, "I’ve always said that I believe South Park is some of the best satire on TV when it’s firing on all cylinders, and to that end I’ve seen it do ironic racism in a way that’s borderline revolutionary [in this episode]."

References

External links
 "With Apologies to Jesse Jackson" Full episode at South Park Studios
 

Quizzes and game shows in popular culture
Television episodes about racism
South Park (season 11) episodes
Jesse Jackson